Navrang is a 1959 Indian Hindi-language film co-written and directed by V. Shantaram. The film is noted for its dance sequences with lead actress Sandhya and music by C. Ramchandra, while playback singer Mahendra Kapoor made his singing debut with the song Aadha Hai Chandramaa Raat Aadhi.

Plot 
In British period India, Diwakar is a poet and loves his wife Jamuna more than anything. But Jamuna feels that Diwakar lives in a fantasy world and is irresponsible in the real world. Diwakar creates a muse from his imagination, who looks exactly like his wife and whom he calls Mohini. Diwakar becomes a recognized poet and Jamuna gives birth to a boy. Unfortunately, the happiness does not last long as Diwakar loses his job because of critical songs against the British. Now he can no longer feed his sickly father nor his son. On top of all this, Diwakar's obsession with Mohini shows no sign of abating, forcing Jamuna to leave their home. 
Diwakar's father also died. In such situation, when he happened to be sit on road, the courtesan Manjari passes from there. She asks him the reason of his such condition, so he narrates all his difficulties. Being Diwakar's faithful, she manages to call Diwakar's wife at Thakur's Birthday function by order of Thakur's mother. Thakur calls Diwakar to sing at his Birthday function but at function he refuses saying that he is unable to write or sing anything as his wife, his inspiration is no more with him. Thakur orders to arrest him. But remembering his wife and muse, he starts singing. During song, his wife also appears in the gallery meant for women beside Thakurain (Thakur's mother). Thakurain tells Jamuna that she is so lucky to have a husband who loves her so much that she is always in his mind even as muse. Then Jamuna recognize Diwakar's talent and love and realizes her mistake and patches up with her husband.

Cast and crew

Cast 
Sandhya as Jamuna/Mohini
Mahipal as Divakar
Keshavrao Date as Janardhan
Chandrakant Mandare
 Baburao Pendharkar as Diwan Daulatrai
Agha as Leelu Rangbaaz
Vatsala Deshmukh
Vandana Sawant
Ulhas
Jeetendra

Crew 
Director: V. Shantaram
Editor : Chintamani Borkar
Banner : Rajkamal Kalamandir
Cinematography : Tyagraj Pendharkar	
Choreographer : Shyam Kumar
Music Director : C. Ramchandra
Lyrics : Bharat Vyas
Audiographer : A. K. Parmar

Music 
Lyrics for all songs written by Bharat Vyas.

Awards and nominations

References

External links 
 
 Review Rediff.com (engl.)

1959 films
1950s Hindi-language films
Indian dance films
Films directed by V. Shantaram
Films scored by C. Ramchandra
Indian epic films